The Last Kingdom is the first historical novel in The Saxon Stories by Bernard Cornwell, published in 2004. This story introduces Uhtred of Bebbanburg, a Saxon noble who is kidnapped by Danish Vikings as a young child and is assimilated into their culture, religion and language before a series of events lead him into the service of King Alfred of Wessex and his participation in multiple battles, including the notable Battle of Cynwit before the book's conclusion.

Plot summary

Osbert is the second son of Ealdorman (Earl) Uhtred, Lord of Bebbanburg in Northumbria. Danes arrive on Bebbanburg's shores, and Ealdorman Uhtred's first son, also called Uhtred, is killed while scouting. Ealdorman Uhtred renames Osbert as Uhtred son of Uhtred. Ealdorman Uhtred is killed during a disastrous attack on Danish-seized Eoferwic (York) and his son is captured by Danish Jarl Ragnar the Fearless. Ragnar, amused by the boy's bravery during the battle, keeps him as a thrall. Uhtred's uncle, Ælfric, takes Bebbanburg and usurps the title of ealdorman from Uhtred, the rightful heir.

Uhtred befriends Ragnar's youngest son, Rorik, and has many clashes with one boy in particular, Sven, son of Kjartan, one of Ragnar's shipmasters. One day, Sven kidnaps Ragnar's daughter, Thyra, and removes part of her clothing in an effort to sexually assault her. Uhtred charges Sven, taking Sven's sword and attacking him with it. Uhtred, Rorik, and Thyra escape back to Ragnar's hall. Ragnar dismisses Kjartan from his service when Kjartan makes light of his son's behaviour. He also crushes one of Sven's eyes with the hilt of his sword - adding darkly that he would have crushed both, had Sven stripped Thyra completely naked.

Uhtred, along with Ragnar and the Danes, then goes raiding across East Anglia, and participates in the conquests of Mercia and East Anglia, and the invasion of Wessex. He is kidnapped by a priest, Beocca, an old family friend. He then escapes from Wessex and rejoins Ragnar. Uhtred enjoys life with the Danes, even after Rorik dies due to a long sickness, but flees after Kjartan and his men set fire to Ragnar's hall and kill everyone who tries to flee. Ragnar remains inside, preferring to die on his terms rather than at Kjartan's hands. Kjartan abducts Thyra.

Uhtred hopes to escape Kjartan's assassins by spreading the rumour that he too died in the hall burning. Uhtred then joins King Alfred in Wessex. There he learns to read and write, and sails with Alfred's fleet of 12 ships against the Danes. After a battle with the Danes, he meets Ragnar the Younger, Earl Ragnar's eldest son, and tells him how his father died and that Thyra was kidnapped. They part friends, swearing that one day they will band together to take revenge on Kjartan and rescue Thyra. Seeking to take command of the fleet, Uhtred gains it on the condition that he marries the orphaned Wessex girl Mildrith. He is not told that, by marrying her, he will also assume her family's very large debt to the Church. Afterwards, he takes part in a siege against Guthrum, and is among a group of hostages exchanged when the Danes and West Saxons make peace. Staying with the Danes in the city over the winter, he again meets Ragnar, who saves him from death when Guthrum breaks the peace and murders the other Saxon hostages. Uhtred then escapes to find his wife. She was taken by Odda the Younger, another Wessex ealdorman, to the north. There he fights in the Battle of Cynwit, where Uhtred kills the renowned Danish leader Ubba Ragnarsson in single combat.

Uhtred then rides with his men to Exanceaster to find his wife and newborn son, instead of going directly to inform Alfred of his victory.

Characters in The Last Kingdom

Fictional
Uhtred - dispossessed Ealdorman of Bebbanburg originally named Osbert
Earl Ragnar the Fearless - Danish warlord who raises Uhtred like his own son
Ragnar Ragnarsson (Ragnar the Younger) - Ragnar's son, Uhtred's foster brother and close friend
Rorik Ragnarsson - Ragnar's younger son and Uhtred's childhood friend
Thyra Ragnarsdottir - Ragnar's daughter, kidnapped by Kjartan
Brida - East Anglian Saxon girl, Uhtred's lover and friend
Sigrid - Earl Ragnar's wife and mother to Ragnar the Younger, Rorik and Thyra
Ravn - blind skald and Earl Ragnar's father
Sven Kjartansson - Uhtred's sworn enemy and Kjartan's son
Kjartan - Danish shipmaster who kills Earl Ragnar
Father Beocca - Alfred's priest and Uhtred's family friend
Mildrith - Uhtred's pious West Saxon wife
Leofric - Uhtred's friend, warrior and shipmaster
Odda the Younger - Ealdorman Odda's son and Uhtred's enemy
Ælfric - Uhtred's uncle and usurper of Bebbanburg
Lord Uhtred of Bebbanburg - Uhtred's father
Gytha - Uhtred's stepmother
Father Wilibald - West Saxon priest serving Alfred and close acquaintance of Uhtred

Historical
King Alfred of Wessex (Alfred the Great) - King of Wessex
Æthelflæd - Alfred's eldest daughter, Lady of the Mercians
Guthrum the Unlucky - Danish warlord
Ubba Ragnarsson - Danish warlord feared by many, older brother to Ivar and Halfdan
Ivar Ragnarsson (Ivar the Boneless) - Danish warlord feared by many, brother to Ubba and Halfdan
Halfdan Ragnarsson - Danish warlord and younger brother of Ubba and Ivar
Ælswith - Alfred's wife, who dislikes Uhtred
Æthelwold - Alfred's nephew and acquaintance of Uhtred
Ealdorman Odda - Ealdorman of Wessex
King Edmund of East Anglia
King Osbert of Northumbria
Wulfhere - Ealdorman of Wiltshire
Haesten - Danish warrior recruited and saved by Uhtred

Television adaptation

In July 2014, the BBC announced that production would begin in autumn 2014 on a television adaptation, to be titled The Last Kingdom. Stephen Butchard is the writer. A series of eight 60-minute episodes was produced, and the series began airing on 10 October 2015. BBC Two, Carnival Films and BBC America were involved in the production.  The series lasted for a total of five seasons, a total of 46 episodes, with the final season airing on 9 March 2022.

Publication details
2004, UK, HarperCollins , Pub date 4 October 2004, hardback
2005, UK, HarperCollins , Pub date 30 May 2005, paperback
2006, UK, HarperCollins , Pub date 3 October 2005, paperback (mass-market)
2006, USA, HarperTorch , Pub date 30 June 2006, paperback (mass-market)

See also
Uhtred (Derbyshire ealdorman), real ealdorman during the book's set era

References

External links
 The Last Kingdom on Netflix

2004 British novels
The Saxon Stories
Novels set in Northumberland
Cultural depictions of Alfred the Great
Cultural depictions of Ivar the Boneless
HarperCollins books